Antoine Predock (born 1936 in Lebanon, Missouri) is an American architect based in Albuquerque, New Mexico. He is the principal of Antoine Predock Architect PC, the studio he founded in 1967.

Predock first gained national attention with the La Luz community in Albuquerque, New Mexico. The first national design competition he won was held by the Nelson Fine Arts Center at Arizona State University. Predock's work includes the Turtle Creek House, built in 1993 for bird enthusiasts along a prehistoric trail in Texas, the Tang Teaching Museum and Art Gallery at Skidmore College, and a new ballpark for the San Diego Padres, the Petco Park. He has also worked on international sites such as the National Palace Museum Southern Branch in Southern Taiwan and the Canadian Museum for Human Rights in Winnipeg, Manitoba.

Predock says his design has been highly influenced by his connection to New Mexico.

Biography

Early life 
Antoine Predock was born on June 24, 1936 in Lebanon, Missouri. He considers himself an Albuquerque native, though he did not move there until college. Predock credits his mother, who had majored in liberal arts in college, for his artistic inclination, and his father, an engineer, for his technical interests.

Predock first attended the University of Missouri in Columbia School of Engineering, then the University of New Mexico, where he studied engineering, emulating his father. Although he was a successful and academically inclined student, Predock found little fulfillment in his studies in engineering. Upon completing a technical drawing course taught by Don Schlegel, an architecture professor at UNM, Predock began to reevaluate his career choices. After a short hiatus from academic life, he returned to UNM at age 21 to study architecture. Schlegel acted as an advisor to Predock throughout the latter's time in the UNM architecture program. Eventually, Schlegel told Predock that he had taken advantage of all that UNM had to offer and encouraged him to apply elsewhere. Predock did, and was accepted to Columbia University, where he obtained his B.A. in architecture.

Career 
Predock established his first office in Albuquerque, New Mexico in 1967. As of April 2019, Predock and his team have offices in Albuquerque and Taipei.

He and his firm have planned, developed, and collaborated on over 100 buildings and projects. They have been featured in over 60 exhibitions, 250 books, and over 1,000 publications. He has also held various teaching positions at at least 14 universities, in the United States and elsewhere.

Awards and honors 

 International Fellow, Royal Institute of British Architects (2015)

 Fellow, Royal Architectural Institute of Canada (2014)
 Senior Fellow, Design Futures Council (2010)
 Cooper-Hewitt National Design Museum Lifetime Achievement Award (2007)
 AIA Gold Medal (2006)

 Honorary Doctor of Humane Letters, University of Minnesota (2001)
 New Mexico Governor's Award for Excellence in the Arts (1989)

 Fellow, American Academy in Rome (1985)

 William Kinne Fellows Traveling Prize, Columbia University (1962-63)

Notable projects

 1970 – La Luz Community, New Mexico
 1971 – University of New Mexico Law School building
 1979 – Albuquerque Museum, New Mexico
 1982 – Rio Grande Nature Center, New Mexico
 1989 – Nelson Fine Arts Center, Arizona State University, Arizona
 1990 – Las Vegas Central Library + Children’s Museum, Nevada
 1991 – Mandell Weiss Forum, University of California, San Diego
 1991 – Venice Beach House, California
 1992 – Classroom + Laboratory Building, California State Polytechnic University, Pomona (Cal Poly Pomona), demolished in 2022
 1992 – Hotel Santa Fe at Euro Disney, France
 1993 – American Heritage Center, University of Wyoming
 1993 – Turtle Creek House, Texas
 1994 – Mesa Public Library, Los Alamos, New Mexico
 1994 – Social Sciences + Humanities Building, University of California, Davis
 1994 – Thousand Oaks Civic Arts Plaza, California
 1995 – Museum of Science & Industry, Florida
 1995 – Ventana Vista School, Arizona
 1996 – Center for Integrated Systems, Stanford University, California
 1996 – Center for Musical Arts, University of California, Santa Cruz
 1997 – Arizona Science Center, Arizona
 1997 – Center for Nanoscale Science + Technology, Rice University, Texas
 1997 – Dance Studio, University of California, San Diego
 1997 – Spencer Theater, New Mexico
 2000 – McNamara Alumni Center, University of Minnesota
 2000 – Tang Teaching Museum – Skidmore College, New York
 2003 – Robert Hoag Rawlings Public Library, Colorado
 2003 – Tacoma Art Museum, Washington
 2004 – Austin City Hall, Texas
 2004 – Flint RiverQuarium, Georgia
 2004 – Performing Arts + Learning Center, Pima Community College, Arizona
 2004 – San Diego Padres Petco Park, California
 2004 – National Palace Museum Southern Branch, Taiwan, withdrawn in 2008
 2006 – Discovery Canyon Campus, Colorado
 2006 – Highlands Pond House
 2006 – Recreation Facility, Ohio State University, Ohio
 2007 – George Pearl Hall, School of Architecture, University of New Mexico
 2007 – Indian Community School, Franklin, Wisconsin
 2007 – Doudna Fine Arts Center, Eastern Illinois University
 2008 – Trinity River Audubon Center, Dallas, Texas
 2008 – Edith Kinney Gaylord Cornerstone Arts Center, Colorado College
 2014 – Canadian Museum for Human Rights, Winnipeg, Manitoba
 In Progress – Inn at The French Laundry, California

References

Antoniades, Anthony C. "Antoine Predock: A Case of Synthetic Inclusivity", L'arquitettura, March 1988, pp. 178–198

External links
 Interview with Antoine Prerock on Grand Opening of Petco Park, 2005
  San Diego Union-Tribune article
 Illustrated page on the Nelson Fine Arts Center in Tempe Arizona
 Antoine Predock's web page
 Modern Home in Dallas, Texas Designed by Architect Antoine Predock
  Indian Community School, Franklin, Wisconsin
 Predock's Architecture School, by Susan Smith, ArchitectureWeek No. 408, 2008.1210, pD1-1.

Modernist architects from the United States
Postmodern architects
 01
1936 births
Living people
American designers
American interior designers
American landscape architects
Architects from New Mexico
Artists from Albuquerque, New Mexico
National Design Award winners
Columbia Graduate School of Architecture, Planning and Preservation alumni
University of New Mexico alumni
University of Missouri alumni
People from Lebanon, Missouri
20th-century American architects
21st-century American architects
Recipients of the AIA Gold Medal